David Kelley (born 1949) is an American philosopher and author.

David Kelley may also refer to:

David C. Kelly, a professor of mathematics
David E. Kelley (born 1956), American television writer and producer
David G. Kelley (born 1928), American politician in the state of California
David H. Kelley (1924–2011), American archaeologist, epigrapher and Mayanist scholar
David M. Kelley (born 1951), American designer and entrepreneur, founder of IDEO
David N. Kelley (born 1959), American attorney and former United States Attorney 
David Kelley (poet) (1941–1999), British poet and scholar; co-founder of Black Apollo Press

See also
 David Kelly (disambiguation)